Megalithomania! is a live album by Coil recorded at their performance at the Megalithomania festival at Conway Hall in London, England. It is limited to a pressing of 230 copies, 123 of which were available in their box set The Key to Joy Is Disobedience.

This performance consists of an extended performance of only one song, "The Universe Is a Haunted House", which has never been released as a studio version.  Another live version of the song appears on Live Four; it is also listed on "CD B" of Live One,  although it is actually the same track as "Blue Chasms".

Track listing
"The Universe Is a Haunted House" – 40:22

Personnel
Credits adapted from the liner notes.

Coil
 Jhon Balance – musician
 Peter Christopherson – musician
 Thighpaulsandra – musician
 Ossian Brown – musician

Additional personnel
 Danny Hyde – sound engineer

References

External links
 
 
 Megalithomania! at Brainwashed

2003 live albums
Coil (band) live albums